Na Fianna are an Irish band, with members Ciarán Finn, Hugh Finn, Peter McMahon and James O'Connor. The current members are successors to the group which were runners-up in the second season of the All Ireland Talent Show TV series in 2010. The original group was first formed in March 2007.

References

External links
 

Irish folk musical groups
Musical groups from County Laois
The All Ireland Talent Show contestants